Rahway station is an NJ Transit train station in Rahway, New Jersey that is located 20.7 miles southwest of New York Penn Station, with service on the Northeast Corridor and North Jersey Coast lines.

History 
The station first opened on January 1, 1836. The station is located in downtown Rahway on an embankment completed in 1913, with bridges over Milton Avenue and Irving and Cherry Streets. The present station was built by New Jersey Transit at a cost of $16 million and opened in early 1999. It replaced a passenger station built by the Penn Central and the New Jersey Department of Transportation in 1974, which was an Amtrak stop from May 1971–November 1975. The City of Rahway completed a $600,000 public plaza in front of the station in 2001.

Another station in the city, North Rahway, previously existed at Scott Avenue, near the Merck facility, but was closed and demolished in 1993.

Platform layout
Rahway is just northeast of the Perth Amboy Junction, where the Northeast Corridor and the North Jersey Coast lines split at Union Tower, so Rahway is one of several transfer stations on NJ Transit. The station has an island platform for the Trenton and Long Branch-bound side of the station. The New York City-bound platform is a side platform more typical of the Northeast Corridor.  Service bound for Long Branch and other points on the North Jersey Coast Line use one side of this island platform just east of the junction, as these trains would not be able to switch off of the main track in time to switch onto tracks at the Junction towards the Jersey Shore.

Amtrak's Northeast Corridor services bypass the station via the inner tracks.

Bibliography

References

External links 

Irving Street entrance from Google Maps Street View
Station House from Google Maps Street View
Milton Avenue entrance from Google Maps Street View
Northeast Corridor timetable - NJ Transit

NJ Transit Rail Operations stations
Railway stations in Union County, New Jersey
Former Amtrak stations in New Jersey
Stations on the Northeast Corridor
Stations on the North Jersey Coast Line
Rahway, New Jersey
Railway stations in the United States opened in 1836
1836 establishments in New Jersey
Former Pennsylvania Railroad stations